Highway 733 is a highway in the Canadian province of Saskatchewan. It runs from Highway 11 near Chamberlain to Highway 354.

Highway 733 also connects with Highways 2 and 732. Near the intersection with Highway 732 is the village of Dilke.

See also 
Roads in Saskatchewan
Transportation in Saskatchewan

References 

733